CyberSquad is a 2017 Hindi web series that premiered 24 August 2017 on video on demand platform ALTBalaji. It revolves around the adventures of four friends who form their own Cyber Squad as they blur the lines between the online and offline worlds.

The series is available for streaming on the ALT Balaji App and its associated websites since its release date.

Plot
The series revolves around four friends, KD (Rohan Shah), Rocky (Omkar Kulkarni), Uzi (Roshan Preet) and Tia (Jovita Jose) who are badass teenagers that help the police capture the most notorious criminals and hackers from their own secret cyber-den. They are young, smart and intelligent who use their high tech skills and arsenal of gizmos to make world a safer place.

Cast

 Rohan Shah as Ketan
 Siddharth Sharma as Armaan Malhotra
 Jovita Jose as Tia
 Omkar Kulkarni as Rocky
 Roshan Preet as Uzi
 Jasmine Avasia as Bianca
 B. Santhanu as Bhonsle
 Prerna Wanvari as Sanjana
 Aarti Dave as Nirupa Desai
 Krissann Barretto as Payal
 Vivek Tandon as  Gabbar
 Chaitanya as Little Rocky
 Sheetal Tiwari as Anjali
 Ambuja Naik as Isha
 Minoli Nandwana as Kaniska
 Sejal Vishvkarma as Little Sanjana
 Shonita Joshi as Sinha Ma'am

Episodes
 Episode 1: I Spy
 Episode 2: Missing
 Episode 3: Money Transfer
 Episode 4: Monster Hunt
 Episode 5: Wedding Woes Part 1
 Episode 6: Wedding Woes Part 2
 Episode 7: Do No Harm
 Episode 8: Be My Valentine
 Episode 9: Hostage Part 1
 Episode 10: Hostage Part 2

References

External links
 Watch CyberSquad on ALT Balaji website
 

2017 web series debuts
Hindi-language web series
ALTBalaji original programming
Indian drama web series
Thriller web series